Zuzana Mauréry (born 23 September 1968) is a Slovak actress working in film, television, and on stage, as well as a musical singer. A six-time nominee for national movie awards and a two-time winner of the Sun in a Net Awards, she lives in her hometown of Bratislava. She is also a member of the Slovak movie and television academy.

Early life and education
Mauréry comes from a family of musicians. Her father, Pavol Mauréry, was an opera soloist in the Slovak National Theatre for many years, while her mother, Darina Markovičová, was a choir soprano at the New Scene / Nová scéna theatre. She was born as their only child, during the period of normalization, shortly after the military intervention of the Warsaw pact in Czechoslovakia.

Thanks to her parents' profession, Mauréry grew up being financially secure. In her own words: "They frequently went to the West, which meant my clothes were quite western. I was the first in my school to wear so-called zipper pants". While attending a middle school for German speakers, she also took dance and piano lessons. Musicals fascinated her by their unusual form, though the singing itself did not. About her studies, Mauréry has said: "I spent my childhood locked up in my room, while my parents had their practice session – which was basically non-stop. I wanted to become a stewardess and study languages, which is why I started learning English alongside German". However, her parents persuaded her to study informatics at the nearby Juraj Hronec Grammar school in Bratislava instead, which was mainly focused on mathematical physics. Despite her focus on natural sciences, Mauréry successfully finished her studies in acting at the Academy of Performing Arts (VŠMU). She studied alongside such well-known actors as Roman Pomajbo, Peter Mankovecký, Dagmar Bruckmayerová, Zuzana Vačková, and Silvia Vargová.

Career
Mauréry's filmography consists of a number of films, both short and feature-length, and various television productions. She has acted in various theatrical productions as well. Her first performance on a theatre stage was in 1985 at Reduta (until 1993 the theatrical studio of the Academy of Performing Arts in Bratislava). She performed alongside her father in the opera Iolanta by Pyotr Ilyich Tchaikovsky.
She has also performed in several musical plays and has made vocal contributions to recordings of other performers.

She is the co-author of the movie Jsem větší a lepší (2007), which combines animated and live-action scenes, together with Martin Duda. The film got a positive reception at various movie festivals, including an international nomination from the American Academy of Motion Picture Arts and Sciences for the best student film of foreign origin. A different short movie, Almost There (2014), was made by Nonchalant, an alias of Mauréry. It won the prize for the best ensemble cast at the 13th Annual International Film Festival 24-hour Film Race, held in Brooklyn. Almost There featured such names as Gregor Hološka, Peter Kadlečík, Michal Jánoš, Anna Rakovská, Juraj Šimko, Mária Breiner-Mačáková, and Viera Frajtová.

Awards and recognition
Mauréry has been nominated four times for a Slovak film and television academy (SFTA) award – twice for a main role and twice for a minor one. She has also been a three-time laureate for the Igric Awards, organized by the Slovak Film Union (SFZ), the Union of Creators for Slovak Television (ÚSTT), and the Literary Fund (LF).

She was nominated for a Sun in a Net award for her role in the feature film Return of the Storks (2007), directed by Martin Repka, though she didn't win.
She received the national movie award in 2014, when she was nominated by the SFTA twice at the same time. She managed to convince the expert jury with her performance in the bilingual drama Ďakujem, dobre (2012) by Mátyas Prikler. At the same time, she was nominated by the Czech Movie and Television Academy (ČFTA) for the Czech Lion award, for her role in the movie Colette (2013) by Milan Cieslar. She didn't win either award, but she received the Igric national creativity award for Best Female Performance.
The actress earned a second Igric award for her performance in the Radio and Television of Slovakia (RTVS) series Tajné životy (2014), directed by Ján Sebechlebský.

Mauréry's performance in the competitive dance show Showdance (2010) on TV JOJ earned her the title "Queen of Dance", accompanied by a symbolic crown.

Charity and activism
Since the end of the first decade of the 21st century, the actress has been active in the spheres of social responsibility and charity. While she focuses mostly on her home city when it comes to protecting the environment, she tends to focus mostly on children and the elderly when it comes to charity and social help.

In January 2010, Mauréry played a key role in a written appeal regarding the preservation of the local Park kultúry a oddychu to the leaders of cultural and scientific development. Other key members included ecologist Mikuláš Huba, actress Zuzana Kronerová, and the member of parliament for the Old Town city district in Bratislava, Ivan Bútora. A year later, she became one of six diplomats of the environmental project of the capital, called Hanging Gardens of Bratislava. She promoted this project in March 2011 by giving an interview to TV Bratislava.

In 2009, 2010, and 2012, she repeatedly supported the nonprofit organization Foundation of the Children of Slovakia, through their public charity Hour for kids, without receiving royalties. She took part in a similar campaign in September 2010, Konto bariéry, which was focused on helping children and disabled youths. It was founded by a nongovernmental organization, The Children's Fund of Slovakia. Mauréry started working with the SOCIA (Foundation for the Support of Social Change) fund shortly afterwards. She worked on the marketing campaign for the calendar Age Affects Us (2011). The actress lent her likeness to the campaign Helping Ladybird, which is focused on helping elderly people. During the Concert of All Generations, which was organized by the same group two years later, she performed together with her father.

The actress has appeared in a similar capacity at various other concerts. She made an appearance at the seventh charitable concert of the Humanitarian council of Slovakia – Benificium (2008). Two years later, she appeared at the concert Flame of Hope, taking place a day before Christmas and sponsored by the fund Headquarters of Hope. In 2010, she symbolically supported the cause of homelessness by baptizing the book of Július, a former street vendor of the NotaBene magazine.

Selected filmography

Film

Television

Theatre

Awards and nominations

References

External links

 
 
 Filmography on CSFD
 Bio and filmography on FDB.cz
 Bio on I-divadlo.cz

1968 births
Living people
Actors from Bratislava
Slovak film actresses
Slovak television actresses
Slovak stage actresses
20th-century Slovak actresses
21st-century Slovak actresses
Sun in a Net Awards winners